A cosine is a function of trigonometry. Cosine or Kosine may also refer to:

Cosine, Saskatchewan
COSine, an annual science fiction convention in Colorado Springs [COS], Colorado
Kosine, stage name of a music producer
Kosinë, an Albanian village in the municipality of Qendër Piskovë

See also
Cosign (disambiguation)